Portrait of a Boy is a 1495 oil on panel portrait, now in the Uffizi in Florence. In the past it has been attributed to Lorenzo di Credi, Viti, Jacopo Francia, Raphael and others, but Giovanni Morelli's reattribution of it to Perugino is now widely accepted. Although the lack of a landscape background is unusual for this painter, the style is typical of his portrait technique.

The subject was long identified as Alessandro Braccesi, but is now held to be unknown. A copy of the work is in the Galleria Borghese in Rome.

Sources
  AA.VV., Galleria degli Uffizi, collana I Grandi Musei del Mondo, Scala Group, Rome, 2003.
  Vittoria Garibaldi, Perugino, in Pittori del Rinascimento, Scala, Florence, 2004 
  Pierluigi De Vecchi, Elda Cerchiari, I tempi dell'arte, volume 2, Bompiani, Milan, 1999 
  Stefano Zuffi, Il Quattrocento, Electa, Milan, 2004 
  Entry on Polomuseale.firenze.it

15th-century portraits
Paintings by Pietro Perugino
1490s paintings
Paintings in the collection of the Uffizi